Nicholas Holliday (born January 17, 2006) is an American professional soccer player who plays as a goalkeeper for USL League One club North Carolina FC.

Club career
Born in Chapel Hill, North Carolina, Holliday began playing recreational soccer at the age of four. Growing up, he also played basketball, lacrosse, and baseball. After rising through Triangle United, Holliday joined the youth academy at then USL Championship club North Carolina FC. In 2020, Holliday signed an academy contract with North Carolina FC, allowing him to play matches while keeping NCAA eligibility.

On May 19, 2021, Holliday made his debut for North Carolina FC U23, the club's USL League Two affiliate, against West Virginia United, starting and playing 45 minutes in the 0–2 defeat.

Holliday made his professional debut for North Carolina FC in USL League One on June 20, 2021 against Chattanooga Red Wolves. He made 10 saves for North Carolina FC despite the club losing 2–3. During his debut, he became the youngest USL League One player to appear for an independent club in league history. On May 21, 2022, Holliday earned his first professional shutout during a 1-0 victory over Greenville Triumph SC.
Was the keeper in goal for NCFC when the Omaha goalie (Piedrahita) scored just 26 second into the game by punting over Holliday's head from his own box. https://prosoccerwire.usatoday.com/2022/08/21/kevin-piedrahita-goalkeeper-goal-union-omaha-usl-league-one/

International career
Holliday was called in to the United States U-17 national team training camp in November 2021 and again in January 2022.

Career statistics

Club

References

External links
 Profile at North Carolina FC

2006 births
Living people
People from Chapel Hill, North Carolina
American soccer players
Association football goalkeepers
North Carolina FC U23 players
North Carolina FC players
USL League Two players
USL League One players
Soccer players from North Carolina